Yan Hong-sen (born 12 February 1951) is a Taiwanese academic and politician. He was a Minister without Portfolio in the Executive Yuan from 2015 to 2016.

Education
Yan obtained his bachelor's degree in mechanical engineering from National Cheng Kung University (NCKU) in 1973. He then obtained his master's and doctoral degrees in mechanical engineering from University of Kentucky in 1977 and Purdue University in 1980, respectively.

Academic career
Upon the end of his studies in the United States, Yan returned to the Department of Mechanical Engineering of NCKU as associate professor from 1980 to 1984, department head from 1986 to 1987 and Vice President from 2011 to 2015. Yan received ASME's Engineer-Historian Award in 2021.

Political career
Yan was appointed as a Minister without Portfolio on 5 February 2015.

References

1951 births
Political office-holders in the Republic of China on Taiwan
Living people
University of Kentucky alumni
Purdue University College of Engineering alumni
National Cheng Kung University alumni
Academic staff of the National Cheng Kung University